Nieva may refer to:

Nieva, a municipality in Spain
Nieva (Spanish group), a rock/electronica band
The Nieva District in Peru
The Nieva River in Peru

See also 

"Nieva, Nieva", a single by Paulina Rubio
Santa María de Nieva, a town in the Amazonas Region of Peru
Santa María la Real de Nieva, municipality of Segovia in Spain
Wil Cordero Nieva, a baseball player
Adrián Nievas of the Argentine band Adicta
Fabrizio Nieva, an Argentinian boxer